Heinz Robert Holliger (born 21 May 1939) is a Swiss virtuoso oboist, composer and conductor. Celebrated for his versatility and technique, Holliger is among the most prominent oboists of his generation. His repertoire includes Baroque and Classical pieces, but he has regularly engaged in lesser known pieces of Romantic music, as well as his own compositions. He often performed contemporary works with his wife, the harpist Ursula Holliger; composers such as Berio, Carter, Henze, Krenek, Lutosławski, Martin, Penderecki, Stockhausen and Yun have written works for him. Holliger is a noted composer himself, writing works such as the opera Schneewittchen (1998).

Biography
Holliger was born in Langenthal, Switzerland. He began playing the oboe at age eleven, and studied at the conservatory of Bern before taking first prize for oboe in the Geneva International Music Competition in 1959. He studied composition with Sándor Veress and Pierre Boulez.

He has become one of the world's most celebrated oboists, and many composers, Luciano Berio, Elliott Carter, Hans Werner Henze, Ernst Krenek, Witold Lutosławski, Frank Martin, Krzysztof Penderecki, Henri Pousseur, Karlheinz Stockhausen, Sándor Veress and Isang Yun have written works for him. He began teaching at the Hochschule für Musik Freiburg, Germany in 1966.

In 1972 Holliger, Maurice Bourgue (oboe), Klaus Thunemann (bassoon), and Christiane Jaccottet (continuo) et al. recorded the Six Trio Sonatas for Oboe and Bassoon by Jan Dismas Zelenka. This recording is credited for the "Zelenka Renaissance".

Holliger has also composed many works in a variety of media. Many of his works have been recorded for the ECM label.

Invited by Walter Fink, he was the 17th composer featured in the annual Komponistenporträt of the Rheingau Musik Festival in 2007 in chamber music and a symphonic concert that he conducted himself, including works of Claude Debussy and Robert Schumann along with his Lieder after Georg Trakl and Gesänge der Frühe on words of Schumann and Friedrich Hölderlin.

On the occasion of Paul Sacher's 70th birthday, Holliger was one of twelve composer-friends of his who were asked by Russian cellist Mstislav Rostropovich to write compositions for cello solo using his name spelt out in German names for musical notes on the theme (eS, A, C, H, E, Re); Holliger contributed a Chaconne for Violoncello Solo. The compositions were partially presented in Zurich on 2 May 1976. The whole "eSACHERe" project was (for the first time in complete performance) performed by Czech cellist František Brikcius in May 2011 in Prague.

Heinz Holliger was married to the harpist Ursula Holliger née Hänggi (1937–2014) until her death on 21 January 2014.

Awards
 1987: Léonie Sonning Music Prize (Denmark)
 1991: Ernst von Siemens Music Prize
 2007: Zürich Festival Prize
 2008: Rheingau Musikpreis
 2016: Honorary member of the American Academy of Arts and Sciences
 2017: Robert Schumann Prize of the City of Zwickau
 2018: Pour le Mérite for Sciences and Arts

Selected works 
 Sequenzen über Johannes I,32 (1962) for harp
 Siebengesang (1966–1967) for solo oboe, orchestra, voices and loudspeaker
 String Quartet (1973)
 Scardanelli-Zyklus (1975–1991) for solo flute, small orchestra, tape and mixed choir
 Come and Go / Va et vient / Kommen und Gehen (1976/1977), opera to a text by Samuel Beckett
 Not I (1978–1980) monodrama for soprano and tape
 Studie über Mehrklänge (1979) for oboe solo
 Lieder ohne Worte (1982–1994), two sets of works for violin and piano
 Präludium, Arioso and Passacaglia, for two guitars (1985)
 Gesänge der Frühe for choir, orchestra and tape, after Schumann and Hölderlin (1987)
 What Where (1988), chamber opera
 Alb-Chehr (1991) for speaker, singers and chamber ensemble
 Fünf Lieder für Altstimme und großes Orchester nach Gedichten von Georg Trakl (1992–2006)
 Violin Concerto "Hommage à Louis Soutter" (1993–1995)
 Schneewittchen (1998), opera based on a text by Robert Walser
 Puneigä, ten songs with twelve players after Anna Maria Bacher's poems (2000/02)
 Ma'mounia for percussion solo and instrumental quintet (2002)
 Romancendres for cello and piano (2003)
 Induuchlen, four songs for counter-tenor and horn, for Klaus Huber (2004)
 Toronto-Exercises for flute (also alto flute), clarinet, violin, harp and marimbaphone (2005)
Lunea (2018), opera based on texts by Nikolaus Lenau

Discography
 Jan Dismas Zelenka: Trio Sonatas (ECM, 1997)
 Sándor Veress: Passacaglia / Songs / Musica Concertante (ECM, 2000)
 Beiseit / Alb-Chehr (ECM, 2000)
 Lauds and Lamentations (ECM, 2003)

References

Sources

Further reading

External links 
 
 Heinz Holliger Schott Music
 Heinz Holliger ECM Records
 
 
 
 Heinz Holliger on 1969 tour of Southern Africa, organised by Hans Adler
 Holliger Heinz (1939) Cdmc website
 Profile, Colbert Artists Management
Sound recordings of works of the composer from the archives of SRG SSR on Neo.Mx3

1939 births
Living people
People from Oberaargau District
20th-century classical composers
Swiss opera composers
Male opera composers
Swiss classical oboists
Male oboists
Swiss classical composers
Swiss conductors (music)
Male conductors (music)
Contemporary classical music performers
Honorary Members of the Royal Academy of Music
Fellows of the American Academy of Arts and Sciences
People from Langenthal
Academic staff of the Hochschule für Musik Freiburg
Members of the Academy of Arts, Berlin
Recipients of the Léonie Sonning Music Prize
Swiss male classical composers
Ernst von Siemens Music Prize winners
Recipients of the Pour le Mérite (civil class)
20th-century conductors (music)
21st-century conductors (music)
20th-century male musicians
21st-century male musicians
20th-century Swiss composers